A safe deposit box, also known as a safety deposit box, is an individually secured container, usually held within a larger safe or bank vault. Safe deposit boxes are generally located in banks, post offices or other institutions. Safe deposit boxes are used to store valuable possessions, such as gemstones, precious metals, currency, marketable securities, luxury goods, important documents (e.g. wills, property deeds, or birth certificates), or computer data, which need protection from theft, fire, flood, tampering, or other perils. In the United States, neither banks nor the FDIC insure the contents. An individual can purchase separate insurance for the safe deposit box in order to cover e.g. theft, fire, flooding or terrorist attacks.

Hotels, resorts, and cruise ships sometimes also offer safe deposit boxes or small safes to their patrons, for temporary use during their stay. These facilities may be located behind the reception desk, or securely anchored within private guest rooms for privacy.

The contents of safe deposit boxes may be seized under the legal theory of abandoned property. They also may be searched and seized by the order of a court through the issuance of search warrant.

In the United States and elsewhere, safe deposit boxes are considered a "legacy service"; many new bank branches do not bother to install any.  In the 20th century, bank branches were more prestigious; in the 21st century, space has grown more valuable with higher land values and rents, and many banks see the service as ancillary to their core business.  Additionally, despite the public perception of safe deposit boxes as being extremely secure, there is little incentive for banks to actually ensure this is true; there are no federal laws in the US governing the matter or rules that would require compensation to customers if property stored there is stolen or destroyed.

See also
Banking in Switzerland
Numbered bank account

References

External links
 The History of the Safe Deposit Box
 The quiet disappearance of the safe deposit box

Banking terms
Privacy
Security technology
Money containers